Panagiotis Kourdakis (born 15 August 1988) is a Greek professional footballer who plays as a centre-back for Hungarian club Maglódi TC.

Career
Born in Kyani, Kourdakis began playing football with AE Didymoteichou. In 2004 after a trial he entered the youth ranks of PAOK. He has been loaned to several lower-level Greek clubs and made his debut in Football League 2 with Thermaikos F.C. in September 2008. He has also played for Pyrsos Grevena F.C. and Anagennisi Epanomi F.C. in Football League 2. He signed for OFI Crete in the summer of 2012 after a short trial period with the club. He debuted for OFI Crete in a 2–1 home win against AEK. Totally he appeared in 18 league matches for the club during the 2012–13 season. Kourdakis was sidelined in the 2013–14 season and was forced to train with the club's U-20 squad. On 8 February 2014 he signed a contract with Greek Football League outfit Iraklis.

Honours
Anagennisi Epanomi
Football League 2
Winner (1): 2010–11

Personal life
Kourdakis was diagnosed with testicular cancer in 2006. He managed to overcome the disease after a series of surgeries and chemotherapies.

References

External links
Profile at Onsports.gr

1993 births
Living people
Greek footballers
Greek expatriate footballers
PAOK FC players
OFI Crete F.C. players
Iraklis Thessaloniki F.C. players
Association football defenders
People from Didymoteicho
Footballers from Eastern Macedonia and Thrace